is a passenger railway station located in the city of Izumiōtsu, Osaka Prefecture, Japan, operated by the private railway operator Nankai Electric Railway. It has the station number "NK20".

Lines

Layout
The station consists of two elevated island platforms with the station building underneath.

Platforms

Adjacent stations

History
The station opened on 1 October 1897, named . It was renamed Izumiōtsu Station on 1 July 1942. The station was rebuilt as an elevated station, completed in August 2012.

Passenger statistics
In fiscal 2019, the station was used by an average of 29,433 passengers daily.

Surrounding area
 Izumiotsu City Hall

See also
 List of railway stations in Japan

References

External links

  

Railway stations in Japan opened in 1897
Railway stations in Osaka Prefecture
Izumiōtsu